The men's hammer throw event at the 1963 Pan American Games was held at the Pacaembu Stadium in São Paulo on 3 May.

Results

References

Athletics at the 1963 Pan American Games
1963